Pachybrachis m-nigrum is a species of case-bearing leaf beetle in the family Chrysomelidae.

References

Further reading

 

m-nigrum
Articles created by Qbugbot
Beetles described in 1847